Antonio Ramiro Romo (born April 21, 1980) is an American sportscaster and former football player who was a quarterback in the National Football League (NFL) for 14 seasons with the Dallas Cowboys. He played college football at Eastern Illinois University, where he made an Ohio Valley Conference championship appearance in 2001 and won the Walter Payton Award the following year. Romo signed with the Cowboys as an undrafted free agent in 2003.

Beginning his career in a backup role, Romo served as the Cowboys' primary starter from 2006 to 2015. He led the Cowboys to four postseason appearances during his tenure, while also receiving Pro Bowl honors amid each playoff run. Romo retired after the 2016 season when a preseason back injury caused him to lose his starting position to backup Dak Prescott. Upon retiring, he was hired by CBS Sports to become the lead color analyst for their NFL telecasts.

Romo holds several Cowboys team records, including passing touchdowns, passing yards, most games with at least 300 passing yards, and games with three or more touchdown passes. He also held a higher passer rating in the fourth quarter than any other NFL quarterback from 2006 to 2013. However, Romo's reputation was affected by a lack of postseason success, having won only two of the six playoff games he appeared in and never advancing beyond the divisional round. His 97.1 passer rating is the highest among retired players who never appeared in the Super Bowl.

Early years
Romo was born in San Diego, California to Ramiro Romo Jr. and Joan Jakubowski. Romo is a "Navy brat," as he was born while his father was stationed at the San Diego U.S. Naval Base. The Romos later returned to Burlington, Wisconsin, where Ramiro worked as a carpenter and construction worker and his wife, Joan, worked as a grocery store clerk. Romo played baseball as a child and was selected to the Little League All-Star team.

Romo's paternal grandfather, Ramiro Romo Sr., emigrated from Múzquiz, Coahuila, Mexico to San Antonio, Texas as an adolescent. The elder Romo cites Tony's success as an example of the possibilities afforded to immigrants in the United States: "I've always said this is a country of opportunities. If you don't get a job or an education, it's because you don't want to." Romo's mother has German and Polish ancestry.

Romo started as quarterback for the Burlington High School Demons beginning as a junior (1996 season). In the 1997 season, Romo and the Demons finished with a 3–6 record, though he earned several honors, including the All-Racine County football team and Wisconsin Football Coaches Association All-State first team honors. Romo also was a starter on the Burlington High School varsity basketball team and also played golf and tennis. In 1998, he joined Caron Butler on the All-Racine County (Wisconsin) team. With per-game averages of 24.3 points, 8.8 rebounds and 4.7 assists, Romo was sought by some mid-major basketball schools in the NCAA such as Wisconsin-Green Bay. Romo graduated from Burlington High School in 1998, with his 1,080 points being the all-time scoring record for the Burlington basketball varsity.

College career

Romo attended Eastern Illinois University in Charleston, Illinois, where he played for the NCAA Division I-AA Eastern Illinois Panthers football team and was a member of Sigma Pi. As a sophomore in 2000, he ranked second in Division I-AA in passing efficiency, completing 164-of-278 (59%) passes for 2,583 yards and 27 touchdowns. After the season, he was honored as an All-America honorable mention, an All-Ohio Valley Conference member, and the OVC Player of the Year. As a junior, he led Division I-AA in passing efficiency, completing 138-of-207 passes for 2,068 yards and 21 touchdowns.

Romo earned OVC Player of the Week honors on October 14, 2002, after his eight-yard scramble run on the last play of the game led Eastern Illinois to a 25–24 win over Eastern Kentucky.

On December 19, 2002, Romo became the first player in Eastern Illinois and Ohio Valley Conference history to win the Walter Payton Award, given annually to the top Division I-AA football player. He finished his career holding school and conference records with 85 touchdown passes. He finished second in school and third in conference history with 8,212 passing yards and second in school history with 584 completions and 941 attempts. As a senior, he set school and conference records for completions with 258 in 407 attempts for 3,418 yards. This was second in conference and third in school history for a season. He threw for 34 touchdowns and scored one rushing touchdown. Romo's 3,149 yards in total offense as a senior ranked third in school and conference history. Along with the Walter Payton Award, Romo earned consensus All-America honors. In addition, he was selected All-Ohio Valley Conference and was named OVC Player of the Year for the third straight year.

During homecoming weekend on October 17, 2009, Eastern Illinois University retired Romo's No. 17 jersey and inducted him into EIU's Hall of Fame. Romo is the first Eastern Illinois player to have his number retired. He said about the event, "It was such an honor to be inducted into the Hall of Fame here, and with the jersey ceremony, it holds a special place in your heart."

On December 7, 2021, Romo was inducted to the College Football Hall of Fame as a member of the 2021 class.

Statistics

Awards and honors
 3× All-OVC (2000–2002)
 3× OVC Player of the Year (2000–2002)
 3× All-American (2000–2002)
 Walter Payton Award (2002)

Professional career

2003–2005
Romo did not initially receive an invitation to attend the 2003 NFL Combine, but received a late invitation to attend as an extra quarterback to throw passes to other prospects during drills. Despite intriguing some scouts, he went undrafted by any NFL team during the 2003 NFL Draft. Throughout the draft, Romo was assured by Dallas assistant head coach Sean Payton of the Cowboys' interest (Romo was also intensely pursued by Denver Broncos head coach Mike Shanahan), and shortly afterwards was signed as an undrafted rookie free agent by the Cowboys. Romo entered the 2003 training camp third on the Cowboys' depth chart behind Quincy Carter and Chad Hutchinson. In 2004, the Cowboys released Hutchinson and signed veteran quarterback Vinny Testaverde and traded a third-round draft pick to the Houston Texans for quarterback Drew Henson. Romo faced being cut from the roster until Carter was released following allegations of substance abuse. Throughout 2004 and 2005, Romo served as the holder for placekicks. After Vinny Testaverde's tenure in Dallas ended in 2005, the Cowboys signed veteran quarterback Drew Bledsoe, the team's eighth starting quarterback since 2000.

One of Romo's early career highlights was in 2004, when (as the third-string quarterback) he rushed for the winning touchdown with six seconds left in a preseason game against the Oakland Raiders. Elevated to the Cowboys' second quarterback in 2005, Romo had strong showings in the 2005 and 2006 pre-seasons. In the 2006 off-season, Sean Payton (now head coach of the New Orleans Saints), offered a third-round draft pick for Romo, but Cowboys' owner Jerry Jones refused, asking for no less than a second-round draft pick.

2006 season

Romo began the season as a backup to starter Drew Bledsoe. He took his first regular season snap at quarterback in a home game against the Houston Texans on October 15. His first NFL pass was a 33-yard completion to wide receiver Sam Hurd. His only other pass of the game was a two-yard touchdown pass, his first in the NFL, to wide receiver Terrell Owens.

One week later, Romo replaced Bledsoe for the start of the second half of a game against the New York Giants. His first pass was tipped and intercepted. He finished with 227 yards, two touchdowns, and three interceptions (one of which was returned for a touchdown). On October 25, Cowboys head coach Bill Parcells announced that Romo would be the Cowboys starting quarterback for the October 29 game against the Carolina Panthers on NBC Sunday Night Football, in Week 8. Romo led the Cowboys to victory in his first game as a starter, 35–14.

On November 19, Romo led the Cowboys past the Indianapolis Colts, the NFL's last unbeaten team. He completed 19 of 23 passes as the Cowboys won against the Colts 21–14. Four days later he helped the Cowboys win in a Thanksgiving Day game against the Tampa Bay Buccaneers by the score of 38–10. Romo went 22–29 with 306 yards and a career-high five touchdown passes. In the month of November, Romo won NFC Offensive Player of the Week twice, once for the Week 10 game against the  Arizona Cardinals and the other for Week 12 against the Tampa Bay Buccaneers.

Romo aided the Cowboys in clinching a playoff spot, their second since Parcells became coach in 2003. He concluded the 2006 regular season with 220 completions on 337 pass attempts for 2,903 yards, 19 touchdowns, and 13 interceptions, with a passer rating of 95.1.

The Cowboys played the Seattle Seahawks in the NFC Wild Card Round on January 6, 2007. With the Cowboys trailing 21–20 on fourth-and-one with 1:19 left in the game, the Cowboys attempted a 19-yard field goal. Romo, the holder for the kick, fumbled the snap. He recovered the ball and attempted to run it in, but was tackled short of the first down marker, and turned the ball over on the Seattle 2-yard line. The Cowboys went on to lose the game. Romo finished the 2006 season ranked seventh in the NFC in passing yards (2,903) and touchdown passes (19).

Romo played in the 2007 Pro Bowl after Drew Brees went down with an elbow injury as a substitution for Marc Bulger. He threw one touchdown and one interception, and was the NFC's kickoff holder in the game.

2007 season

Romo began the 2007 season with four touchdown passes and an additional touchdown rush, the first of his career, defeating the New York Giants 45–35 in the Cowboys' first game of the regular season He earned NFC Offensive Player of the Week for Week 1. Romo added 329 passing yards and two touchdown passes in the Cowboys' Week 3 34–10 win over the Chicago Bears. The following week, he passed for 339 yards and three touchdowns in a 35–7 win over the St. Louis Rams. He ran for an additional touchdown. Romo earned NFC Offensive Player of the Month for September. In September 2007, Romo's father was diagnosed with prostate cancer. Romo stated that, while upset about the family crisis, he still had to continue to focus on his career.

In Week 5, on Monday Night Football against the Buffalo Bills, Romo threw five interceptions (four in the first half, two of which were returned for touchdowns) and lost a fumble in the 25–24 victory. He became the second person in the history of Monday Night Football to throw five interceptions in a winning effort. 

On October 29, Romo reached an agreement to a six-year, $67.5 million contract extension with the Cowboys.

On November 29 against the Green Bay Packers, in a game between 10–1 teams, Romo threw four touchdown passes (bringing his season total to 33), breaking Danny White's (29) record from 1983. He earned NFC Offensive Player of the Week for his game against the Packers. On December 22 against the Carolina Panthers, Romo became the first Cowboys' quarterback to pass for more than 4,000 yards in a season. December 30 against the Washington Redskins, Romo broke the Cowboys' season completions record with his 335th completion, a short pass to tight end Jason Witten. The Cowboys finished the season with a 13–3 record. He finished the 2007 season with 4,211 passing yards, 36 touchdowns,	and 19 interceptions. He earned a second consecutive Pro Bowl nomination.

In the Cowboys' Divisional Round game against the New York Giants, Romo was unable to lead his team to a come-from-behind victory. On fourth down with less than half a minute and no timeouts left, Romo threw the ball into the end zone, but it was intercepted by Giants cornerback R. W. McQuarters, ensuring that the Cowboys were eliminated from the playoffs with a 21–17 loss to the eventual Super Bowl XLII champions.

2008 season
On September 7, 2008, Romo led the Cowboys to a 28–10 win over the Cleveland Browns in their season opener. Romo completed 24 of his 32 passes for a total of 320 yards and one touchdown. After the game, Romo required 13 stitches for a large gash on his chin that occurred during the third quarter when linebacker Willie McGinest hit him in the chin with his helmet. The NFL fined McGinest $7,500 for the hit.

On September 15, Romo led the Dallas Cowboys to a 41–37 win against the Philadelphia Eagles in the second game of the 2008 season. Romo completed 21 of his 30 passes for a total of 312 yards and three touchdowns. The 54 combined points scored by the Cowboys and Eagles in the first half were the second most points scored in a half during a Monday Night Football game. That same month, Romo signed a 5-year, $10 million endorsement deal with apparel marketer Starter, but was not allowed to wear footwear on the field as the company did not have a contract with the NFL.

Romo and the Cowboys won their third straight before losing to the Washington Redskins, falling to 3–1. Following a win against the Cincinnati Bengals, Romo was injured in a loss to the Arizona Cardinals. The Cowboys, under Brad Johnson, went 1–2 the next three games, losing to the St. Louis Rams, beating the Tampa Bay Buccaneers, and losing to the New York Giants.

In what became a de facto third playoff game for Romo shortly prior to its start, on December 28, Romo and the Cowboys failed to compete against the Philadelphia Eagles in a 44–6 loss. Romo committed three turnovers in the game and threw for 183 yards and no touchdowns.  The loss dropped Romo's combined record in December to 5–8 and again raised questions about his performance in games of consequence.

2009 season

Romo led the Cowboys to a 34–21 win over the Tampa Bay Buccaneers in their season opener. He completed 16 of his 27 passes for a then-career-high 353 yards along with three touchdowns.

Romo and the Cowboys were defeated in week 2 against the New York Giants in the Cowboys home opener at their new Cowboys Stadium. Romo completed 13 of 29 passes for 127 yards and one touchdown. He also threw three interceptions, one of which was returned for a touchdown for the Giants.

In a Week 13 road game against the division rival New York Giants, Romo passed for a career-high 392 yards, along with three touchdown passes. He completed a career-high 41 passes in the 31–24 setback.

After several kicks were missed by kicker Nick Folk due to bad holds by punter Mat McBriar, Romo resumed holding duties for the first time since the 2006 in their 13th game of the season, versus the San Diego Chargers.

In Week 15, Romo led the Cowboys to a win against an undefeated team late in the season for the second time in his career. On December 19, 2009, he defeated the 13–0 New Orleans Saints at New Orleans, throwing for 312 yards and one touchdown. He earned NFC Offensive Player of the Month for December.

Romo finished the 2009 season as the first quarterback in team history to take every snap for a full season. He also passed his own mark for single season passing yardage, with 4,483 yards, and became the first Cowboys quarterback to throw more than 20 touchdowns and fewer than ten interceptions in a season. His eight 300 yard games was also a team record, surpassing his own record from 2007. His 1.6% interception percentage tied a team record, and his career interception percentage became the lowest in franchise history.

The Dallas Cowboys became the NFC East division champions with their season finale shutout of the Philadelphia Eagles, the second division title in Romo's three full seasons as the starting quarterback. Romo was named to the Pro Bowl for the third time in his career.

Romo had a 104.9 passer rating in a 34–14 win over the Philadelphia Eagles in the Wild Card Round of the playoffs, earning the first playoff win in 13 years for the Cowboys, and his own first career post-season win. However, the following week in the Divisional Round against the number two seed Minnesota Vikings, Romo had three fumbles (losing two), an interception and was sacked six times in the 34–3 loss.

2010 season
In Week 5 against the Tennessee Titans, Romo threw for a career-high 406 yards and three touchdowns. However, he also threw two costly interceptions in the fourth quarter, resulting in 34–27 loss at Cowboys Stadium. Romo and the Cowboys were desperate for a win with a record of 1–3 and last in the division. They played against the Minnesota Vikings, who also had a 1–3 record and were in need of a win. Romo threw for over 200 yards and three touchdowns but also threw two costly interceptions. The Cowboys lost the game by a score of 24–21.

During the October 25, 2010 Monday Night Football game against the New York Giants, Romo suffered a broken left clavicle. The injury occurred during the second quarter, when Romo was driven to the turf by Giants linebacker Michael Boley. He was placed on Injured Reserve on December 21, 2010, and replaced by veteran Jon Kitna. He was ranked 72nd by his fellow players on the NFL Top 100 Players of 2011.

2011 season
Romo's 102.5 quarterback rating in 2011 was fourth best in the league behind Aaron Rodgers, Drew Brees, and Tom Brady, and second highest in Cowboys history.

Romo had four fourth-quarter comebacks in 2011.

In Week 2 against the San Francisco 49ers, Romo suffered a broken rib and a punctured lung on a hit from Carlos Rogers in the second quarter that forced him to miss part of the game. Romo came back in the final seconds of the third quarter and played the fourth quarter throwing for a touchdown and driving down the field for the game-tying field goal with four seconds left in the game to force overtime. On the first offensive possession for the Cowboys in overtime, Romo connected with Jesse Holley for 77 yards to set up the 19 yard game-winning field goal. Romo finished the game with 345 yards and two touchdowns with a 116.4 rating despite the cracked rib and punctured lung. For his performance in this game, Romo earned the NFC's Offensive player of the Week Award. Romo played with a protective vest for a few games to protect his torso.

In Week 10, Romo posted the second highest quarterback rating of his career with a rating of 148.40 in Week 10 against the Buffalo Bills.

In Week 16 against the Philadelphia Eagles, Romo suffered a severely bruised hand when he smashed it against an opposing player's helmet. He left the game after attempting just two passes with no completions. The next week, in the season finale at MetLife Stadium against the New York Giants, the NFC East title and a playoff spot was at stake for whichever team won, with the loser eliminated from playoff contention. Romo started the game despite the hand injury the previous week. He posted 29 out of 37 passing for 289 yards, two touchdowns and one interception for a 106.0 quarterback rating and a 78% pass completion rate (second highest of the season) as the Cowboys lost the game 31–14, dropped to an 8–8 record and were eliminated from playoff contention.

Romo accounted for 32 of the 39 total touchdowns the Cowboys scored in the 2011 NFL season (82.1%). No other player in the 2011 regular season contributed a higher percentage of team touchdowns (Cam Newton with 72.9% was second). Romo finished the 2012 season with 4,184 passing yards, 31 passing touchdowns, and ten interceptions. He was ranked 91st by his fellow players on the NFL Top 100 Players of 2012.

2012 season
Daniel Jeremiah, an NFL.com analyst, ranked Romo as the 9th best quarterback in the league heading into the 2012 season. 

Romo started the 2012 season with 307 passing yards, three passing touchdowns, and one interception in the 24–17 victory over the New York Giants. In Week 8, in the second divisional matchup with the New York Giants, he passed for 437 passing yards, one passing touchdown, and four interceptions. He attempted a career-high 62 passes in the 29–24 loss. In Week 12, against the Washington Redskins, he passed for 441 yards, three touchdowns, and two interceptions. He matched his career-best 62 pass attempts in the 38–31 loss. In Week 13 against the Philadelphia Eagles, Romo threw three touchdown passes. The first pass, a 23-yard throw to Dez Bryant with 11:18 left in the third quarter, gave Romo 166 career touchdown passes, surpassing the previous franchise record of 165 which had been held by Troy Aikman.

After trailing the Cincinnati Bengals 19–10 with 6:35 left, Dallas beat Cincinnati 20–19 in Week 14 (December 9). The fourth quarter comeback consisted of a 27-yard touchdown pass from Romo to Bryant and a last-second 40-yard field goal by Bailey. Romo went 25-for-43 for 268 yards, with one touchdown and one interception.

Topping a three-game winning streak and winning its fifth out of six games, Dallas beat the Pittsburgh Steelers 27–24 in overtime in Week 15 (December 16). The win put Dallas in a three-way tie with the New York Giants and Washington Redskins in the NFC East. Romo surpassed 25,000 career passing yards in this game with 30-for-42 passing for 341 yards and two touchdowns.

On Week 16 (December 23), despite Romo's four touchdown passes and 416 passing yards (on 26-for-43 passing), Dallas lost to the New Orleans Saints, 37–34, in overtime. Following that game, Dallas and the Washington Redskins faced off in Week 17 for the NFC East title, where Dallas lost 28–18. With overall 20-for-37 passing, Romo threw a total of three interceptions, including on Dallas' first two drives. With 5:50 left and down 21–10, Romo made a touchdown pass to Kevin Ogletree and two-point conversion pass to Dwayne Harris. After Dallas took over with 3:33 left down 21–18, Romo threw an interception to Redskins linebacker Rob Jackson, and Washington clinched the victory with another touchdown. Dallas finished the 2012 season with an 8–8 record and failed to make the playoffs for the third straight season. While his 19 interceptions led the league, he was credited with five fourth-quarter comebacks.

Following the season, the future of Romo's career was called into question. Mac Engel of the Fort Worth Star-Telegram commented: "Tony Romo has one year remaining on his contract, but the time has come for him to move on...He will be 33 in April of '13, and still has a few good years left but at this point he needs to go to another team that needs a quarterback." In a Fox Sports Southwest interview, Rick Gosselin of The Dallas Morning News also called Romo "not wired to win the last game of the season" especially "[i]f it means extending the season." Dan Graziano of ESPNDallas.com wrote that Romo's "record starts to become very hard to defend" due to "the oft-cited fact that he's got just the one playoff win in his entire career."

2013 season
The Cowboys signed Romo to a 6-year extension worth $108 million, with $55 million guaranteed and $25 million in bonuses, thus securing him for the rest of his career and relieving the pressure from the salary cap, which was reported to have less than $25,000 space before the deal was struck. In the middle of April 2013, he underwent back surgery to remove a cyst. Although it was characterized as a minor procedure by the team, he would end up missing all of the mini-camp and organized team activities.

Romo opened the season with a win over the New York Giants, passing for 263 yards and two touchdowns. He briefly left the game with a rib injury, but returned after halftime and finished the game. After Week 7, his 100th career start, Romo had thrown for 27,485 yards, the most by a quarterback in his first 100 starts since 1960. In Week 5, against the Denver Broncos, Romo passed for a franchise-record 506 passing yards, five passing touchdowns, and one interception in the 51–48 loss. The game was a memorable back-and-forth shootout between the two teams with Romo and Peyton Manning at the helm.

In Week 16, against the Washington Redskins, with the Cowboys trailing in the fourth quarter and needing a win to keep its playoff hopes alive, he led the team to a touchdown drive with 1:08 remaining in a 24–23 victory, with what was later diagnosed as a season-ending herniated disk injury. Head coach Jason Garrett would later say: "He might have had his finest hour … We talk about mental toughness, being your best, regardless of circumstances. Somehow, some way, he helped us win that ballgame."

Romo underwent back surgery on December 27, 2013, and was placed on the Cowboys' injured reserve list. Garrett announced Kyle Orton as the starting quarterback for the Week 17 game against the Philadelphia Eagles, which the team lost 24–22, to miss the playoffs for a fourth straight year. Romo finished the 2013 season with 3,828 passing yards, 31 passing touchdowns, and ten interceptions. He was ranked 71st by his fellow players on the NFL Top 100 Players of 2014

2014 season
After a poor performance in the season opening 28–17 loss versus the San Francisco 49ers, Romo and the Cowboys won six consecutive games, including back-to-back road games against the Tennessee Titans and the St. Louis Rams. The Cowboys also defeated the defending champion Seattle Seahawks on the road, becoming only the second team to win a road game against the Seahawks in the three seasons. In Week 5, against the Houston Texans, Romo pulled off a memorable escape from J. J. Watt's pursuit on a play that resulted in Romo throwing a 43-yard touchdown in the 20–17 victory. Through those six wins, Romo had a 13:3 touchdown:interception ratio. In Week 8, against the Washington Redskins, Romo went down with a back injury when linebacker Keenan Robinson sacked him, with his knee going into Romo's back. After the loss to Washington, it was revealed that Romo had two fractures in his transverse process. He missed the next game, a 28–17 loss to the Arizona Cardinals, but came back the next week and went on to lead the Cowboys to a 12–4 record and their first divisional title since 2009.

On December 21, Romo set the Dallas Cowboys team record for highest completion percentage in a game with 90%, completing 18 of his 20 passes in a 42–7 blowout win over the Indianapolis Colts. He set his personal best quarterback rating in a single game with 151.7. Romo's 133.7 passer rating in the month of December was the highest in NFL history. He was named NFC Offensive Player of the Month for December. He was named to the Pro Bowl.

In the Wild Card Round of the playoffs, Romo led the Cowboys to a 24–20 comeback victory over the Detroit Lions after being down 17–7 at halftime. Romo was 19-of-31 for 293 yards with two touchdowns and no interceptions. In the Divisional Round, Romo and the Cowboys were defeated by the Green Bay Packers, 26–21. Romo was 15-of-19 for 191 yards with two touchdowns and no interceptions. Romo was involved in a controversial sequence in the fourth quarter of the game. Romo completed a 31-yard pass to Dez Bryant on a fourth-and-2 play from the Packers' 32-yard line. Although Bryant caught the ball with both feet down in bounds, Bryant bobbled the ball as he made an attempt to reach for the endzone. Referees initially ruled Bryant down at the 1-yard line, but overturned the call as an incomplete pass following a challenge from the Packers.

Romo led the NFL in completion percentage and passer rating en route to the NFC East title. He finished tied for 3rd in MVP voting. He was ranked 34th by his fellow players on the NFL Top 100 Players of 2015. He was the highest undrafted player on the year's list.

2015 season
Romo started strong in the 2015 season, throwing a game-winning pass to Jason Witten with seven seconds left in the Cowboys' season opener against the New York Giants. He passed for 356 yards, three touchdowns, and two interceptions in the 27–26 victory. He continued to show success in a Week 2 victory over the Philadelphia Eagles, but suffered a broken left collarbone in the third quarter after being sacked by linebacker Jordan Hicks. The injury sidelined Romo for eight weeks, during which the Cowboys failed to win a single game with Brandon Weeden and then Matt Cassel as starting quarterback.

Romo returned to the starting lineup in a Week 11 game against the Miami Dolphins. Despite throwing two interceptions, he completed 18 of 28 passes for 227 yards and two touchdowns in a 24–14 victory, ending the Cowboys' seven-game losing streak.

The Cowboys then faced the 10–0 Carolina Panthers in a Week 12 Thanksgiving game. Although up against an undefeated team and holding only a 3–7 record, the Romo-led Cowboys were favored to win and still had hopes for the playoffs in a weak NFC East division. However, Romo threw three interceptions in the first half, two of which were returned for touchdowns, helping the Panthers take a 23–3 lead. At the end of the third quarter, Romo was sacked by linebacker Thomas Davis, reinjuring his left shoulder and ending his season. Romo remained on the active roster until December 21 when he was placed on injured reserve after the Cowboys dropped to 4–10, officially ending their playoff hopes.

2016 season
Romo was unable to start in the 2016 regular season after suffering a compression fracture to the L1 vertebra in his back during the Cowboys' third preseason game against the Seattle Seahawks. The injury caused him to miss the first 10 games of the season, with the duties of the team's starting quarterback being assumed by rookie Dak Prescott.

Although Cowboys owner Jerry Jones initially said Romo would remain the team's starter when he returned, Prescott's success with the team and the length of Romo's injury led to Jones reconsidering his decision. Amid Prescott guiding the team to an eight-game winning streak, Romo conceded his role as starting quarterback to Prescott and began serving as the Cowboys' backup when he returned to the active roster in Week 11. Romo made his season debut in the regular season finale on January 1, 2017, against the Philadelphia Eagles. In what would prove to be the final play of his career, he threw a touchdown pass to Terrance Williams before Mark Sanchez played the rest of the game.

Retirement
On April 4, 2017, Romo announced his retirement from the NFL. After announcing his retirement, he was released by the Cowboys, per his request. Following his retirement, Dallas Mavericks owner Mark Cuban announced that Romo would be a "Maverick for a day" for the Mavericks' final home game of their 2016–17 season. He warmed up with the team and sat in full uniform on the bench, but did not play in the game and was not considered an official member of the roster.

NFL career statistics

Regular season

Postseason

Career awards and highlights
 4× Pro Bowl selection (2006, 2007, 2009, 2014)
 Second-team All Pro (2014)
 NFC passing yards leader (2009)
 NFC passing touchdowns leader (2007)
 NFL passer rating leader (2014)
 NFL completion percentage leader (2014)
 2× NFC passer rating leader (2007, 2014)
 3× FedEx Air Player of the Week (Week 1, 2007, Week 13, 2007, Week 5, 2013)
 2× NFC Offensive Player of the Month
 Ed Block Courage Award (2011)

NFL records

Career
 Most consecutive road games with at least one touchdown pass: 41 (2009 – 2016) 
 Most games in a season with a passer rating of at least 135.0 (6)

Dallas Cowboys team records

Career
 Passing yards (34,183)
 Passing touchdowns (248)
 Games with at least 3 touchdown passes: 40; previously held by Danny White (20)
 Games with at least 300 yards passing: 46; previously held by Troy Aikman (13)
 Most fourth quarter comebacks/game-winning drives: 28; previously held by Roger Staubach (23)
 Consecutive games with a touchdown pass: 38 (2012–2014); previously held by Romo (20, 2010–11)

Season
 Games with at least 300 yards passing: 9 (2012); previously held by Romo (8 – 2009)
 Passing yards: 4,903 (2012); first Cowboys' quarterback to throw for more than 4,000 yards in a season (2007, 2009, 2011, 2012)
 Attempts: 611 (2012); previously held by Romo (550 – 2009)
 First quarterback in franchise history to average over 300 passing yards a game in a season (306.4 – 2012)

Game
 Romo twice threw five touchdown passes in a game (November 23, 2006, and October 6, 2013) a record he shares with Troy Aikman (September 12, 1999).
 On December 21, 2014, Romo completed a team record 90.0% of his passes (18 of 20) in a home game against the Indianapolis Colts.
 Most passing yards in a game, 506 yards against the Denver Broncos on October 6, 2013.

Broadcasting career
Following his retirement from the NFL, he was hired by CBS Sports to serve as the lead color analyst for the network's NFL telecasts, working in the booth alongside play-by-play announcer Jim Nantz, replacing Phil Simms, who was moved to the studio for The NFL Today.

While there was no controversy of Romo deciding to retire and move on to broadcasting, some critics questioned Romo being immediately hired for the number one position ahead of broadcasting veterans Dan Fouts, Trent Green, or Rich Gannon, all of whom served in the number 2–4 positions, respectively, for CBS, with Fouts having once been the color commentator on Monday Night Football. None of the ex-players and coaches in a lead position on other networks at the time of Romo's hiring (Troy Aikman, Cris Collinsworth, and Jon Gruden) started their broadcasting career in the lead position. Simms jokingly asked Romo "How does that seat feel?" during Week 1 of The NFL Today.

Once the 2017 NFL season got underway, Romo received critical praise for his work as a recent ex-player, most notably for his ability to predict offensive plays and read defensive formations from the booth, and "adding an enthusiasm that had been lacking with Simms."

Romo and Nantz received further acclaim for their broadcasting of the 2018 AFC Championship Game between the Kansas City Chiefs and the New England Patriots, as "Nantz continually set Romo up to make his predictions and analysis prior to the snap", and some suggested that Chiefs head coach "Andy Reid could have used Romo on his defensive staff, because the former quarterback knew just about every play the Patriots were going to run down the stretch." According to The Guardian, the "beauty of Romo's analysis is that it feels like he's in on the fun with you." That season, Romo and Nantz called Super Bowl LIII in Atlanta.

The New Yorker has called him a "genius of football commentary." Romo has received praise from other prominent sports commentators, including Bob Costas and Dick Vitale.

In February 2020, Romo renewed his contract with CBS through 2030, with the network reportedly paying him $17 million per year making Romo one of the highest-paid personnel in sports broadcasting and "the highest-paid NFL analyst in television history."

Romo began to face increased criticism of his broadcasting ability during the 2021 NFL season. He was criticized for talking too much, telling confusing stories and seeming to be confused during crucial parts of games. The New York Post reported that following the season, CBS staged an intervention believing that Romo's analysis had begun to regress. Multiple CBS executives met with Romo to discuss their concerns that he was not preparing adequately to call games and that his chemistry with Nantz had declined.

Criticism of Romo's broadcasting increased further during Romo's sixth year as the lead play-by-play broadcaster for CBS. According to Front Office Sports, Romo's analysis during the 2022 season was inane, obvious and at times made little sense. He was said to be shouting at viewers, making odd vocalizations and talking too much during the broadcast. Furthermore, his ability to correctly predict plays has become increasingly rare. Some have speculated that Romo being removed from the field for a number of years is responsible for the perceived decline in his broadcasting ability.

Endorsements
In 2018, Romo filled the vacancy of Jon Gruden in Corona's "Corona Hotline" commercials. Romo has maintained his recurring position in the series of advertisements, and many of the television ad spots feature his fantasy football advice.

Philanthropy
, Romo hosted a youth football camp in Burlington, Wisconsin, annually during the summer, since 2004. In the Dallas area, Romo participated in community activities in collaboration with United Way, the Make-A-Wish Foundation, and the Society for the Prevention of Cruelty to Animals.

Personal life

In November 2007, Romo began dating American singer and actress Jessica Simpson. On December 16, 2007, Simpson attended a Dallas Cowboys–Philadelphia Eagles game at Texas Stadium, in which Romo had a bad performance in the loss to the Eagles. Controversy erupted before the playoff game against the New York Giants—a game the Cowboys would lose—when pictures surfaced of Romo (along with teammates Jason Witten and Bobby Carpenter) at a resort in Cabo San Lucas with Simpson. On July 13, 2009, People reported that Romo and Simpson broke up on July 9, 2009, the night before her 29th birthday.

On May 28, 2011, Romo married Candice Crawford, the 2008 Miss Missouri USA, a former journalist for Dallas television station KDAF, and the sister of actor Chace Crawford. They had dated since the summer of 2009, and became engaged on December 16, 2010. The couple have three sons together: Hawkins Crawford Romo (born April 9, 2012), Rivers Romo (born March 18, 2014), and Jones McCoy Romo (born August 23, 2017).

Romo is an avid amateur golfer, and attempted to qualify for the 2004 EDS Byron Nelson Championship and the 2005 U.S. Open, but failed. During the offseason, when not training, he plays golf around Dallas. He failed to make the cut in qualifying for Byron Nelson in 2008. In February 2018, it was announced that he had received a sponsor's exemption to play in the PGA Tour's Corales Puntacana Resort and Club Championship in Punta Cana, Dominican Republic from March 22–25. Romo missed the cut with scores of 77 and 82, dead last in the 132-man field after the second round. In July 2018, he won the American Century Championship, a celebrity tournament.

Romo is a Christian and has spoken about his faith saying, "My faith has grown and I found that always having Jesus makes things a lot easier in my life. Having Jesus in your life gives you everlasting peace, which never goes away. It helps you handle the ups and downs of professional football."

See also
 List of 500-yard passing games in the National Football League
 List of most consecutive games with touchdown passes in the National Football League

References

External links

 
 
 Dallas Cowboys biography

1980 births
Living people
American Christians
American football quarterbacks
American people of German descent
American people of Polish descent
American philanthropists
American sportspeople of Mexican descent
American television sports announcers
College Football Hall of Fame inductees
Dallas Cowboys players
Eastern Illinois Panthers football players
Ed Block Courage Award recipients
National Conference Pro Bowl players
National Football League announcers
People from Burlington, Wisconsin
Players of American football from Dallas
Players of American football from San Diego
Players of American football from Wisconsin
Sportspeople from the Milwaukee metropolitan area
Unconferenced Pro Bowl players
Walter Payton Award winners